Heather Anderson (born 31 January 1959 Dundee) is a Scottish National Party (SNP) politician who briefly served as the Member of the European Parliament (MEP) for the Scotland constituency in late January 2020.

Political career
Anderson was elected as a councillor for the Tweeddale West ward at the 2017 Scottish Borders Council election.

She was originally placed fifth on the Scottish National Party list for the 2019 European Parliament election, in which the party won three seats. However, following the election to the UK House of Commons of first-placed Alyn Smith at the 2019 United Kingdom general election, he ceased to be an MEP, since an individual cannot serve as a representative in both a member state's legislature and the European Parliament. Fourth-placed Margaret Ferrier was also elected to the UK parliament at the same election. This made Anderson eligible for the newly vacant SNP seat, which she took up on 27 January 2020. She would, however, serve as an MEP for only four days, until 31 January when the Brexit process completed.

At the 2022 Scottish local elections, Anderson stood as councillor for the SNP in Dundee City Council. She was elected in the election and won her seat in Coldside at first preference with 31.1% of the vote.

Personal life
Anderson is an organic farmer who owns her own produce and butcher's shop in the Scottish Borders.

References

External links 

 European Parliament Page

1959 births
21st-century women MEPs for Scotland
Councillors in Scotland
Living people
MEPs for Scotland 2019–2020
Politicians from Dundee
Scottish National Party councillors
Scottish National Party MEPs
Women councillors in Scotland